Planomicrobium flavidum is a bacterium from the genus of Planomicrobium which has been isolated from a marine solar saltern.

References

Bacillales
Bacteria described in 2009